Democratic and Social Movement can refer to:

Democratic and Social Movement (Algeria)
Democratic Social Movement, a political party in Greece
Democratic and Social Movement (Morocco)
Democratic-Social Movement (Poland)